The 2011 Nebraska Danger season was the first season for the Nebraska Danger as a professional indoor football franchise and their first in the Indoor Football League (IFL). One of 22 teams competing in the IFL for the 2011 season, the Nebraska Danger were members of the Great Plains Division in the Intense Conference.

The team played their home games under head coach Mike Davis at the Eihusen Arena in Grand Island, Nebraska. The Danger earned a 3-11 record, placing 4th in the Great Plains Division, and failed to qualify for post-season play.

Schedule
Key:

Preseason

Regular season

Roster

Standings

References

External links
 Nebraska Danger official website

Nebraska Danger
Nebraska Danger
Nebraska Danger